Sahnitherium is a possible basal Euarchontan from the Maastrichtian of the Intertrappean Beds of Andhra Pradesh, India. It may be closely related to Deccanolestes. The holotype is an upper molar, and it is the only specimen of Sahnitherium.

References 

Prehistoric eutherians
Cretaceous mammals
Extinct animals of India
Prehistoric mammal genera